Phil Wade Kelso (26 May 1871 – 13 February 1935), born in Largs on the Firth of Clyde, Scotland, was a Scottish football manager.

Career 
Kelso was manager of Hibernian for one season, before taking over as manager of newly promoted Woolwich Arsenal in 1904. He managed the club for four years, during which time he took the side to the FA Cup semi-finals two seasons in a row; however, his best in the league was seventh (in 1906-07).

With the club starting to run into financial trouble and with results declining, Kelso resigned in 1908 to return to Scotland to manage a hotel; but was tempted back down south to become manager of Fulham in 1909. He stayed with the Cottagers for 15 years, making him their longest-serving manager.

Personal life 
Kelso worked at the Royal Arsenal during the First World War. After retiring from football he managed pubs in the Hammersmith area and was chairman of the Football League Managers and Secretaries Association. Kelso died in London, in 1935, aged 63. He is buried in East Sheen.

References

1871 births
1935 deaths
Scottish football managers
Arsenal F.C. managers
Fulham F.C. managers
Hibernian F.C. managers
People from Largs
Scottish Football League managers
Sportspeople from North Ayrshire
English Football League managers